Enver Hadžiabdić (born 6 November 1945) is a Bosnian retired professional football manager and former player.

He is so far the only person in Željezničar history to have won league titles both as a player and as a manager. As a player he won the Yugoslav First League with Željezničar in 1972 and the First League of Bosnia and Herzegovina in 1998.

Club career
Hadžiabdić started playing football in the youth teams of Iskra Bugojno and Bratstvo Travnik, before signing his first professional contract with Željezničar in 1965. During the next nine years at Željezničar, he played more than 450 games for the club. He also won the Yugoslav First League in the 1971–72 season with Željezničar.

In 1974, Hadžiabdić signed with Belgian side Charleroi where he stayed for three seasons. After Charleroi he went back to Bosnia and Herzegovina and joined Velež Mostar. After 2 years at Velež, Hadžiabdić went to Greece and signed a contract with AEL where he stayed 1 year and afterwards retired from professional football in 1980 at the age of 35.

International career
Hadžiabdić was one of the best European defenders in the early 1970s and he made his debut for Yugoslavia in an April 1970 friendly match against Austria and has earned a total of 11 caps, scoring no goals. He was also a member of the team that participated in the 1974 FIFA World Cup. His final international was a July 1974 World Cup match against Sweden.

Managerial career
After retirement, Hadžiabdić returned to Sarajevo where he graduated from the University of Sarajevo Faculty of Physical Education.

Managing in Iran and Qatar
In 1994, Hadžiabdić became a manager of the Iran Olympic team, and two years later in 1995, manager of the Al-Rayyan youth team. He was the manager of the youth team until 1997.

Željezničar
In January 1998, Hadžiabdić took over the place of manager in his favourite Željezničar. He managed to lead the club to the Bosnian championship title in his first season. In the winter of 1999, Hadžiabdić stepped down because of disappointing league results, despite winning the Bosnian Supercup in 1998 against the club's biggest rivals - Sarajevo.

Nevertheless, he was back again next season in 1999 in which he guided the club to its first Bosnian Cup title in 2000. He again left the club shortly after winning the cup.

Tirana
In 2002, Hadžiabdić became the new manager of Albanian Superliga club Tirana. In his only season with the club, he won the Albanian Supercup on 14 September 2002 after beating Dinamo Tirana 6–0 in that year's Supercup. He was sacked by the club management on 21 February 2003 after a series of poor results.

Return to Željezničar
After several years working as a stadium director, Hadžiabdić yet again became manager of Željezničar on 10 January 2007, working as manager until January 2008.

Honours

Player
Željezničar 
Yugoslav First League: 1971–72

Manager
Željezničar 
First League of Bosnia and Herzegovina: 1997–98
Bosnian Cup: 1999–2000
Bosnian Supercup: 1998

Tirana 
Albanian Supercup: 2002

References

External links

1945 births
Living people
Footballers from Belgrade
Bosniaks of Serbia
Association football defenders
Yugoslav footballers
Yugoslavia international footballers
1974 FIFA World Cup players
UEFA Euro 1976 players
FK Željezničar Sarajevo players
R. Charleroi S.C. players
FK Velež Mostar players
Athlitiki Enosi Larissa F.C. players
Yugoslav First League players
Belgian Pro League players
Yugoslav expatriate footballers
Expatriate footballers in Belgium
Yugoslav expatriate sportspeople in Belgium
Expatriate footballers in Greece
Yugoslav expatriate sportspeople in Greece
Bosnia and Herzegovina football managers
FK Željezničar Sarajevo managers
KF Tirana managers
Premier League of Bosnia and Herzegovina managers
Kategoria Superiore managers
Bosnia and Herzegovina expatriate football managers
Expatriate football managers in Iran
Bosnia and Herzegovina expatriate sportspeople in Iran
Expatriate football managers in Qatar
Bosnia and Herzegovina expatriate sportspeople in Qatar
Expatriate football managers in Albania
Bosnia and Herzegovina expatriate sportspeople in Albania